Radio Room is a bar and restaurant in Portland, Oregon.

Description 
Radio Room is a bar and restaurant on Alberta Street in northeast Portland's King neighborhood. Alex Frane of Eater Portland described Radio Room as "a multi-roomed, double-decker diner and bar ... open every day of the year with almost every kind of service, including brunch, lunch, dinner, and a daily happy hour from 10 p.m. to 2 am., one of the latest in town". The menu has included chorizo burritos, fish tacos, poutine, Caesar salad, Brussels sprouts, and a vegan barbecue sandwich.

History 
Designed by Ankrom Moisan Associated Architects, the restaurant opened in 2008.

Brian Alfrey is a co-owner.

Reception 

Alex Frane included Radio Room in Eater Portland's 2019 list of "14 Spots to Day-Drink in Portland". He wrote, "Not only is it open every day at 9 a.m. with the full drink menu on offer, but the diner-style bar Radio Room is open 365 days a year for year-round day-drinking. With an extensive breakfast and lunch menu, full bar, cocktails, beer, wine, and coffee drinks, it's easy to while away a day here, especially out on the double-decker patio with a view of Alberta." In 2020, he also included the restaurant in an overview of "Portland's Legit Late-Night Happy Hours" and a list of "Portland's 9 Ideal Rooftop Patios for Views, Drinks, and Sun". The website's Brooke Jackson-Glidden included Radio Room in a 2020 overview of "Where to Throw a Bachelorette Party in Portland", writing: "In an artsy-funky space on Alberta, Radio Room is a good choice for a relaxed meal with plenty of drinks. Whether it's more of a bachelorette brunch or a late-night party on the upstairs patio, Radio Room can accommodate most, and easily handles larger parties."

Radio Room was also included in Eater Portland's 2021 list of "14 Cozy Portland Restaurants and Bars with Fireplaces". The website said, "Although Radio Room is mostly known for its large outdoor fireplace on the lower-floor patio, the dining room with the retro bingo sign is also home to a burly wood stove. To lean into the cold-weather vibes, opt for a bowl of the soup du jour, or a hearty plate of brunch biscuits and gravy." Frane also included Radio Room in a 2022 list of "17 Portland Bar Patios for Winter Revelry". He said the restaurant has "always sported one of the best patios on Alberta, with multiple levels, coverings, heaters, and plant life, making it a lovely space to watch a sunset".

See also

 List of diners
 List of New American restaurants

References

External links 

 
 Radio Room at Zomato

2008 establishments in Oregon
Diners in Portland, Oregon
Drinking establishments in Oregon
King, Portland, Oregon
New American restaurants in Portland, Oregon
Restaurants established in 2008